WIP or WiP may refer to:

Political parties
 Wildrose Independence Party of Alberta, a political party in Alberta, Canada
 Western Independence Party of Manitoba, a former Canadian provincial political party
 Western Independence Party of Saskatchewan, an active Canadian provincial political party
 Western Independence Party, a former Canadian federal political party

Radio stations
 WIP-FM, in  Philadelphia, Pennsylvania
 WTEL (AM), which held the call sign WIP until 2014

Other uses
 Washington Ireland Program, a development program bringing Irish students to Washington, D.C.
 Wireless Internet Protocol
 Women in prison film, an exploitation film genre
 Work in process, also referred to as work in progress. an unfinished work
 Wash-in-place, a method of cleaning the interior surfaces of closed industrial equipment (e.g. brewing,  pharmaceutical, or chemical) without the need to disassemble them. See also the related Clean-in-place.
 Warner Independent Pictures, an American independent film division of Warner Bros.
 Fraser–Winter Park station (Amtrak code WIP), a train station in Colorado
 "Wip", a track by Die Monster Die from the album Withdrawal Method
 Water Injection Plant
 Windows Insider Program

See also
 Whip (disambiguation)